La face de Bellevarde is a World Cup downhill ski course in France, on Rocher de Bellevarde mountain in Val d'Isere, Savoie; it debuted at the 1992 Winter Olympics with the men's downhill.

It is only about  kilometres up the road from "Piste Oreiller-Killy" in La Daille, another legendary course with a lengthier World Cup tradition.

With 17.8 degrees (32.1%) incline it is the world's steepest giant slalom course in average gradient, with no flat sections, only steepness the whole time.

History
The course was developed for the 1992 Winter Olympics, designed by Swiss Olympic dowhnill champion Bernhard Russi, a respected constructor of downhill slopes around the world. The official opening was planned for late 1991 with two World Cup events, but the course was not yet finished. Both were moved to the nearby Oreiller-Killy course, and held on 7–8 December.

The Bellevarde course was officially opened two months later at the Olympics with the men's downhill competition; later events on the slope included combined, super-G, and giant slalom.

Near the end of 1992, the World Cup circuit premiered on this course with Super-G and slalom events on 6–7 December; the downhill was cancelled due to poor weather conditions. In February 2008, World Cup races returned after an absence of more than fifteen years; it became a regular host on the men's calendar, rarely exchanged with Oreiller-Killy. 

A year later in February 2009, Val d'Isere hosted its first World Championships. All of the men's events and the women's technical events (GS, SL) were held on the Bellevarde slope; the team event was cancelled.

Course sections from GS start
Passage de la Rute, Le Rocher, Slalom Start, Le Stade Olympique, La Flamme

Olympics

Men's events

World Championships

Men's events

Women's events

Team event
Poor weather conditions.

World Cup
It is part of traditional annual "Critérium of the First Snow" (Critérium de la première neige) competition.

Men

References

External links 
 Val d’Isère Ski area ValdIsere.com 
 Piste Map – Val d’Isère ValdIsere.com 
 Val d’Isère La Face de Bellevarde danslestracesdeschampions-eurosport.canalsat.fr
 The Bellevarde Face worldcup-ValdIsere.com 
 History worldcup-ValdIsere.com 

Alpine skiing in France
Skiing in France